Different Man is the third studio album by American country music singer Kane Brown, released on September 9, 2022, through RCA Records Nashville. Brown co-produced the album, which was preceded by the singles "One Mississippi", "Like I Love Country Music", and "Grand", with "Thank God", a duet with his singer-songwriter wife Katelyn Brown, which impacted country radio on September 12. The songs "Leave You Alone" and "Whiskey Sour" were also released ahead of the album.

Content
Brown co-produced one of his albums for the first time, which took time to adjust to, with Brown saying that "We went from a demo to a master recording to redoing everything. I was listening to the album and not liking the sounds. [...] We kept revamping things, working and finding the sound I've been looking for, adding in more rock and country sounds". The New York Times described Brown's duet with his wife Katelyn as a "folk-pop duet" and "Grand" as "post-Drake R&B", but that the album overall is "determinedly traditional", bookended odes to Brown's "rural Southern roots".

Commercial performance
Different Man debuted at number five on the US Billboard 200, including number two on the Top Country Albums chart with 46,000 album equivalent units. The album also reached number six in Canada and number 17 in Australia.

Track listing

Personnel
Musicians

 Kane Brown – lead vocals (all tracks), background vocals (1–4, 6, 8, 9, 11, 15–17)
 Josh Reedy – background vocals (1–4, 8–10, 12, 14, 15, 17)
 Matt McGinn – background vocals (1, 6)
 Ilya Toshinskiy – banjo (1, 4, 9, 15, 17), acoustic guitar (2–4, 7–17), ukulele (15)
 Jimmie Lee Sloas – bass guitar (1–4, 7, 9–12, 15–17)
 Aaron Sterling – drums (1–4, 6–12, 14–17), percussion (1, 2, 4, 6, 7, 12, 17); congas, shaker (11)
 Dann Huff – electric guitar (1–4, 8–10, 12, 14, 16, 17), programming (1, 3, 4, 9, 12, 15, 16), synthesizer (1, 4), Dobro (3), piano (4), mandolin (3, 17), bass guitar (9), twelve-string guitar (10, 17), acoustic guitar (14, 16)
 Derek Wells – electric guitar (1–4, 7–12, 14–17)
 Lars Thorson – fiddle (1, 9, 17)
 Charlie Judge – organ (1, 8–11, 15, 16), strings (1, 2, 8), synthesizer (1, 2, 4, 8–12, 14, 17); horn, timpani (2); piano (4, 8, 11, 15, 16), keyboards (7), celeste (16), whistles (17)
 Justin Niebank – programming (1–4, 8, 9, 11, 12, 14–17)
 David Huff – programming (1–4, 7–9, 11, 12, 14–17), synthesizer (7), slide guitar (16)
 Josh Hoge – background vocals (2)
 Paul Franklin – steel guitar (2–4, 7, 10–12, 14–17)
 Dave Cohen – organ, piano (3)
 Jordan Schmidt – background vocals (4)
 Stuart Duncan – fiddle (4, 10, 15)
 Alex Wright – synthesizer (4)
 Eric Arjes – background vocals (5)
 Andrew Goldstein – guitar, keyboards, programming (5)
 Solomon Philcox-Littlefield – acoustic guitar, electric guitar (6)
 Devin Dawson – background vocals (6)
 Lindsay Rimes – background vocals, electric guitar, keyboards, programming, synthesizer (6)
 Justin Schipper – steel guitar (6)
 Shy Carter – background vocals (7)
 Craig Young – bass guitar (8, 14)
 Jesse Frasure – programming, synthesizer (10, 11, 15); bass guitar (15)
 Trey Keller – background vocals (11, 12, 16)
 Natalie Stovall – fiddle (13)
 Ernest Keith Smith – background vocals (16)

Technical

 Kane Brown – producer (6, 13)
 Adam Ayan – mastering (1–4, 6–17)
 Dave Kutch – mastering (5)
 Drew Bollman – mixing (1, 2, 4, 7–12, 14–17), recording (2–4, 9–11, 15, 16), engineering assistance (3)
 Justin Niebank – mixing (1–4, 7–12, 14–17)
 Adam Hawkins – mixing (5)
 Jeff Braun – mixing (6, 13); vocal production, vocal engineering (5)
 Buckley Miller – recording (1, 7, 8, 12, 14, 17)
 Lindsay Rimes – recording, editing, overdub engineering, producer (6)
 Ilya Toshinskiy – recording, editing, overdub engineering, producer (13)
 Kyle Manner – recording (13)
 Chris Small – editing (1–4, 7–12, 14–17), vocal engineering (3)
 David Huff – editing (1–4, 7–12, 14–17)
 Andrew Goldstein – editing, producer (5)
 Eric Arjes – editing (5)
 Simon Philcox-Littlefield – overdub engineering (6)
 Dann Huff – overdub engineering (1, 2, 4, 7, 9, 11, 12, 14–17), producer (1–4, 7–12, 14–17)
 Jaime Sickora – overdub engineering (2)
 Russell Terrell – overdub engineering (3)
 Trey Keller – overdub engineering (11)
 Steve Marcantonio – overdub engineering (16)
 Zach Kuhlman – engineering assistance (1, 7, 12, 17)
 Eric Fleming – engineering assistance (2)
 Kam Luchterhand – engineering assistance (2, 9, 15, 16)
 Lucas Glenney-Tegtmeier – engineering assistance (2, 9, 15, 16)
 Sean Badum – engineering assistance (3, 10, 11)
 Jordan Reed – engineering assistance (8, 14)

Charts

Weekly charts

Year-end charts

References

2022 albums
Albums produced by Dann Huff
Kane Brown albums
RCA Records albums